Dil Juunglee is an Indian romantic comedy film written and directed by Aleya Sen. It stars Taapsee Pannu, Saqib Saleem, Abhilash Thapliyal, Nidhi Singh, Ayesha Kaduskar, Srishti Shrivastava and Santosh Barmola. It was released on 9 March 2018 to mainly negative reviews.

Plot 
Koroli Nair, the sole child of a London-based business tycoon, settles in Delhi to fulfil her 'pursuit of happiness'. Much to her dad's disappointment, she has no interest in upgrading herself as an entrepreneur & wants to settle down with a man and be a mother to her future kids. She teaches English at the British Council in New Delhi which makes her feel content & satisfied in her own way.

Sumit Uppal, a typical Lajpat Nagar 'launda', wants to make it big as an actor in Bollywood. He works as the star trainer at a local gym & has clearly worked on his aesthetics & physique. He is a highly ambitious man with star-studded dreams of walking the red carpet, brushing shoulders with some of Bollywood's finest actors and actresses.

He joins Koroli's English class at the British Council. Initially meeting one another as a teacher and student, their proximity escalates when they meet each other in a nightclub. Later, this creates a path for attraction, with the radically opposite duo growing close to one another.

The story revolves around the friendship and love story of Sumit and Koroli, along with the general nuances of a relationship. The ups and downs of love and friendship are portrayed in various manners.

Cast 
 Taapsee Pannu as Koroli Nair
 Saqib Saleem as Sumit Uppal
 Abhilash Thapliyal as Prashant
 Nidhi Singh as Ayesha Kumar
 Srishti Shrivastava as Shumi
 Ayesha Kaduskar as Geetika
 Santosh Barmola as Jai Singh Rathore
 Krishan Tandon as Mr. Nair, Koroli's Father

Soundtrack 

The song Gazab Ka Hai Din is the remake of the song originally composed by Anand–Milind and sung by Alka Yagnik and Udit Narayan from the film Qayamat Se Qayamat Tak, recreated by Tanishk Bagchi.

Critical reception 

Renuka Vyavahare of The Times of India gave the film a rating of 2.5 out of 5 saying that, "Barring the earnest performances of the lead actors and the supporting cast, there's absolutely nothing wild or memorable about Dil Juunglee." Sweta Kausal of the Hindustan Times gave the film a rating of 2 out of 5 saying that, "Dil Juunglee is yet another repeat of the centuries-old love story with a cliched narrative. It is only Taapsee Pannu's charm and Saqib Saleem's earthiness that keep the movie from getting unbearable." Saibal Chatterjee of NDTV gave the film a rating of 1.5 out of 5 saying that, " Every bit in Taapsee Pannu and Saqib Saleem's film is a bit on the wild side, completely arbitrary and illogical." Shubhra Gupta of The Indian Express gave the film a rating of 1 out of 5 saying that, "The Taapsee Pannu and Saqib Saleem starrer follows the standard rom-com template, and apart from literally a few moments, the whole thing is a slog."

Namrata Joshi of The Hindu reviewed the film saying that, "Disjointed, tackily put together with no sense of drama and direction, it will be difficult to top this one on the inanity stakes this year." Sukanya Verma of Rediff gave the film a rating of 1 out of 5 saying that, "Just when it looks our film-making is moving away from idolising toxic archetypes for the sake of romantic fulfillment, Aleya Sen's Dil Juunglee comes along and squashes it in entirety." Umesh Panwani of Koimoi gave the film a rating of 1 out of 5 saying that, "Dil Juunglee is one of those films you give someone a dare to watch." Arnab Banerjee of Deccan Chronicle gave the film a rating of 1 out of 5 saying that, "Touted as a romantic comedy this Taapsee Pannu and Saqib Saleem starrer is the kind of film whose screenwriting, acting and plot twists are so unforgivable, they leave you more embarrassed than entertained."

References

External links 
 
 

2018 films
2018 romantic comedy films
Indian romantic comedy films
Films scored by Sharib-Toshi
Films scored by Tanishk Bagchi
Films scored by Guru Randhawa
Films scored by Rajat Nagpal
Films scored by Abhishek Arora
2010s Hindi-language films